Igor Mandić (born 16 October 1991) is a Bosnian handball player for Limoges Hand 87 and the Bosnian national team.

He represented Bosnia and Herzegovina at the 2020 European Men's Handball Championship.

References

External links

1991 births
Living people
Bosnia and Herzegovina male handball players
Sportspeople from Sarajevo
Expatriate handball players
Bosnia and Herzegovina expatriate sportspeople in France
Bosnia and Herzegovina expatriate sportspeople in North Macedonia
RK Borac Banja Luka players

Serbs of Bosnia and Herzegovina